Wireless: Live at the Arnolfini, Bristol is an ambient live album by Biosphere. It was recorded on 27 October 2007 at Bristol, United Kingdom. Biosphere performed tracks from some his previous albums (Substrata, Cirque, Shenzhou and Dropsonde) and also three new pieces ("Pneuma", "Calais Ferryport" and "Pneuma II").

Track listing
"Pneuma" – 2:13 	
"Shenzhou" – 6:22 	
"Birds Fly By Flapping Their Wings" – 6:45 	
"Kobresia" – 6:37
"When I Leave" – 6:20 	
"Warmed By the Drift" – 7:23 	
"The Things I Tell You" – 9:39 	
"Moistened and Dried" – 3:07 	
"Sherbrooke" – 6:11	
"Calais Ferryport" – 5:39 	
"Pneuma II" – 1:56

Credits
All tracks written and performed by Geir Jenssen
Mixed and mastered – BJNilsen
Photography – Jon Wozencroft
Additional Field Recordings – Jony Easterby
Recorded – Chris Watson

References

2009 albums
Biosphere (musician) albums
Touch Music albums